Jordan Rinaldi (born September 25, 1987) is an American mixed martial artist. He was the welterweight Complete Devastation champion. Rinaldi competed in featherweight division of the Ultimate Fighting Championship (UFC).

Background
Rinaldi was born in Olean, New York, New York, United States, His family moved to Charlotte, North Carolina where Rinaldi grew up with his two older brothers and three stepsisters.  Even though he played baseball and football at the young age, as a late bloomer with only 93 lbs body weight frame, he followed his brother and started wrestling training when he started his freshman year in high school. Rinaldi attended University of North Carolina at Charlotte after his high school  and working at the car wash station part-time. His coworker at the car wash who was a BJJ practitioner introduced him to BJJ, and since then he has transitioned from wrestling to MMA.

Mixed martial arts career

Early career
Rinaldi fought in a number of promotions including World Series of Fighting (WSOF) and Resurrection Fighting Alliance (RFA) during his early MMA career. He picked up eight stoppages in 12 professional career wins since his 2010 debut, noticeably held wins over former UFC veterans Dennis Bermudez, Diego Saraiva and Clay Harvison. He held a 5 fight winning streak prior to signing with the UFC. Rinaldi competed for the featherweight title for Resurrection Fighting Alliance (now known as Legacy Fighting Alliance) in 2012 and lost the fight to Jared Downing. He was the former Welterweight champion for Complete Devastation promotion where he submitted Tenyeh Dixon who missed the welterweight upper limit of 22 lbs on that fight.

The Ultimate Fighter
Rinaldi was one of the contestants for the UFC TV MMA fighting competition, The Ultimate Fighter 15 (TUF 15) also known as The Ultimate Fighter: Live in 2012. He faced Joe Proctor during the entry round and lost the fight via submission on round 1 and failed to accepted to the TUF house.

Ultimate Fighting Championship
Rinaldi made his promotional debut as a short notice replacement, filling in for Carlos Diego Ferreira who was pulled out from the fight due to a potential USADA violation, against Abel Trujillo on May 29, 2017 at UFC Fight Night: Almeida vs. Garbrandt. He lost the fight via unanimous decision.

Rinaldi next faced Álvaro Herrera on August 5, 2017 at UFC Fight Night: Pettis vs. Moreno. He won this fight via submission (Von Flue choke) in round one. The submission victory was Rinaldi's first in the UFC. He is also the fourth fighter in UFC history to have defeated an opponent with a Von Flue Choke submission.

Rinaldi faced Gregor Gillespie on January 27, 2018 at UFC on Fox: Jacaré vs. Brunson 2. He lost the fight via TKO in the first round.

Rinaldi faced Jason Knight on November 3, 2018 at UFC 230. He won the fight via unanimous decision.

Rinaldi faced Arnold Allen on March 16, 2019 at UFC Fight Night 147. He lost the fight by unanimous decision.

On May 16, 2019 it was reported that Rinaldi was released by UFC.

Championships and accomplishments

Mixed martial arts
Complete Devastation 
Complete Devastation Welterweight Champion (One time) vs. Tenyeh Dixon

Personal life
Rinaldi works as a corporate financial analyst and he earned his BS in Accounting and BSBA in Finance degrees from University of North Carolina at Charlotte.

Mixed martial arts record

|Loss
|align=center|14–7
|Arnold Allen
|Decision (unanimous)
|UFC Fight Night: Till vs. Masvidal 
|
|align=center|3
|align=center|5:00
|London, England
|
|-
| Win 
|align=center|14–6
|Jason Knight
|Decision (unanimous)
|UFC 230 
|
|align=center|3
|align=center|5:00
|New York City, New York, United States
| 
|-
|Loss
|align=center|13–6
|Gregor Gillespie
|TKO (punches)
|UFC on Fox: Jacaré vs. Brunson 2 
|
|align=center|1
|align=center|4:46
|Charlotte, North Carolina, United States
|
|-
| Win
| align=center| 13–5
| Álvaro Herrera
| Submission (Von Flue choke)
| UFC Fight Night: Pettis vs. Moreno
| 
| align=center|1
| align=center| 2:00
| Mexico City, Mexico
|
|-
| Loss
| align=center| 12–5
| Abel Trujillo
| Decision (unanimous)
|UFC Fight Night: Almeida vs. Garbrandt 
| 
| align=center|3
| align=center|5:00
| Las Vegas, Nevada, United States
|
|-
| Win
| align=center| 12–4
| Lashawn Alcocks
| Submission (armbar)
| Fight Lab 52
| 
| align=center|2
| align=center| 4:14
| Charlotte, North Carolina, United States
|
|-
| Win
| align=center| 11–4
|  Clay Harvison
| Submission (rear-naked choke)
| Legacy FC 47
| 
| align=center|2
| align=center| 4:31
| Atlanta, Georgia, United States
|
|-
| Win
| align=center| 10–4
| Diego Saraiva
| Decision (unanimous)
| National Fighting Championship 75
| 
| align=center|3
| align=center|5:00
| Duluth, Georgia, United States
|
|-
| Win
| align=center| 9–4
| Soslan Abanokov
| Submission (inverted triangle keylock)
| WSOF 17
| 
| align=center|3
| align=center|3:02
| Las Vegas, Nevada, United States
|
|-
| Win
| align=center| 8–4
| Joe Elmore
| Decision (unanimous)
| US Freedom Fighting Championship 21
| 
| align=center|3
| align=center| 5:00
| Morganton, North Carolina United States
|
|-
| Loss
| align=center| 7–4
|James Moontasri
| KO (punch)
| Resurrection Fighting Alliance 15
| 
| align=center|2
| align=center| 1:14
| Culver City, California, United States
|
|-
| Win
| align=center| 7–3 
| Mike Stevens
| TKO (punches)
| Rings of Dreams: Fight Night 14
| 
| align=center|1
| align=center| 1:19
| Winston-Salem, North Carolina, United States
|
|-
| Loss
| align=center| 6–3
| Ronnie Rogers
| Decision (split)
| US Freedom Fighting Championship 15
| 
| align=center|3
| align=center| 5:00
| Charlotte, North Carolina, United States
|
|-
| Loss
| align=center| 6–2
| Brian Ortega
| Submission (triangle choke)
| Resurrection Fighting Alliance 9
| 
| align=center|3
| align=center| 2:29
| Los Angeles, California, United States
|
|-
| Loss
| align=center| 6–1
| Jared Downing
| Decision (unanimous)
| Resurrection Fighting Alliance 5
| 
| align=center|5
| align=center| 5:00
| Kearney, Nebraska, United States
|
|-
| Win
| align=center| 6–0 
| Mark Dickman
| Decision (unanimous)
| Resurrection Fighting Alliance 3
| 
| align=center|3
| align=center| 5:00
| Kearney, Nebraska, United States
|
|-
| Win
| align=center| 5–0 
| Tenyeh Dixon
| Submission (armbar)
| Complete Devastation 2
| 
| align=center|2
| align=center| 4:6
| Altoona Pennsylvania United States
|
|-
| Win
| align=center| 4–0 
| Dennis Bermudez
| Submission (rear-naked choke)
| PA Fighting Championships 4
| 
| align=center|1
| align=center|2:13
| Harrisburg, Pennsylvania, United States
|
|-
| Win
| align=center| 3–0 
| Carlos Pena
| Submission
| Top Combat Championship 3
| 
| align=center|1
| align=center| 3:24
| San Juan, Puerto Rico
|
|-
| Win
| align=center| 2–0 
| Biff Walizer
| Submission (rear-naked choke)
| Premier Cage Fighting 3
| 
| align=center|1
| align=center|2:42
| Hamburg, Pennsylvania, United States
|
|-
| Win
| align=center| 1–0 
| Joey Carroll
| Decision (split)
| Fight Lab Promotions: Epicentre Cage Fights 3
| 
| align=center|3
| align=center| 5:00
| Charlotte, North Carolina, United States
|
|-

See also
 List of current UFC fighters
 List of male mixed martial artists

References

External links
 
 

Living people
1987 births
American male mixed martial artists
Lightweight mixed martial artists
Mixed martial artists utilizing wrestling
Mixed martial artists utilizing Brazilian jiu-jitsu
People from Olean, New York
Sportspeople from Charlotte, North Carolina
Ultimate Fighting Championship male fighters
American practitioners of Brazilian jiu-jitsu
People awarded a black belt in Brazilian jiu-jitsu